The emu is a large, flightless bird.

Emu or EMU may also refer to:

Biology
 Emu (Dromaius novaehollandiae), an Australian bird 
 Emu and the jabiru, an Aboriginal myth
 Emu oil, a medicinal oil
 Emu War, to cull emus in Western Australia in 1932
 Emu-wren, bird in the genus Stipiturus
 Emus (beetle), a genus of beetles
 Emu apples (Kunzea pomifera), native to the southern coast of Australia
 Emu bush (disambiguation), a number of Australian plants

Geography

Australia
 Emu Bay, South Australia, on Kangaroo Island
 Emu Bay shale, a geological formation in Emu Bay, South Australia
 Emu Brewery, a historic site in Perth
 Emu Creek (disambiguation), various places in Queensland
 Emu Field, South Australia, an atomic weapons test site
 Emu Flat, South Australia
 Emu Flat, Victoria, a suburb of Melbourne
 Emu Heights, a suburb of Sydney
 Emu Heights, a suburb of Burnie, Tasmania
 Emu Park, a suburb in Brisbane, Australia
 Emu Plains, a suburb of Sydney, Australia
 Emu Plains Correctional Centre
 Emu Plains railway station
 Emu Ridge, a suburb in the Australian Capital Territory, a housing estate

Japan
 Emu-wēbu, an indoor sporting arena in Nagano

Entertainment
 E.mu, a Japanese music group
 Emu (puppet), a puppet used by the British entertainer Rod Hull
 Ernest Emu, a character in the Crash Bandicoot video games
 Flying Emus, a 1980s Australian band

Companies and brands
 Emu Brewery, historic site in Perth
 Emu (beer), a Western Australian beer
 Emu Airways, a defunct Australian regional airline
EMU Australia, an Australian lifestyle brand
 Emu Bay Railway, Tasmania
 E-mu Systems, a digital audio company

Technology

 EmuTOS, an operating system for the Atari ST
 E-mu Emulator, a digital music keyboard
 Emulator, a program to run software from other platforms

Other uses
  Emu, palm wine in the (Nigerian) Yoruba language
 Emu (journal), a scientific journal
 Emu (ship), a British merchant and convict ship
 Emu (II) / Brightside (ferry), an Australian ferry used in Brisbane and Sydney between 1865 and 1908
 Emu Lehtinen (1947–2017), Finnish record dealer
 Emu and the jabiru, an Aboriginal myth
 Emu oil, a medicinal oil
 Emu War, to cull emus in Western Australia in 1932
 Experimental Military Unit (EMU), a joint Australian-American company-sized helicopter assault force which operated during the Vietnam War
 Penrith Emus Rugby, a western Sydney rugby union club

See also
 EMU (disambiguation), as an acronym
 Imu, a traditional Hawaiian cooking method